Shahid Shah Nazar (also Romanized as Shahīd Shāh Naz̧ar) is a village in Gowhar Kuh Rural District, Nukabad District, Khash County, Sistan and Baluchestan Province, Iran. At the 2006 census, its population was 88, in 20 families.

References 

Populated places in Khash County